Marquette Hotel may refer to:
 Pere Marquette Hotel, Peoria, IL, listed on the NRHP in Illinois
 Marquette Hotel (Cape Girardeau, Missouri), listed on the NRHP in Missouri
 Marquette Hotel, an early name of the Lorraine Motel where Martin Luther King was assassinated, now the National Civil Rights Museum
 Marquette Hotel (Springfield, Missouri), listed on the NRHP in Greene County, Missouri
 Marquette Hotel (St. Louis, Missouri), listed on the NRHP in St. Louis, Missouri
 Marquette Hotel (Minneapolis, Minnesota), located in the IDS Center on Marquette Avenue